Isahaya Bay (諫早湾, Isahaya-wan) is a bay that is part of the Ariake Sea, located north-west of the Shimabara Peninsula in Nagasaki Prefecture, Japan.

In 1986, the government of Isahaya began a 235 billion-yen reclamation project of a tidal flat by closing off part of the bay for agricultural purposes with it being completed in 2008. However, the reclamation project was met with series of protests from local fishermen, who says that the closing of the bay has caused changes in currents along with mass pollution within the bay, which has affected their catches.

Geography 
The bay is connected to the Ariake Sea in the northeast. Taradake Mountain is northwest of the bay and the Shimabara Peninsula is to the south.

References 

Landforms of Nagasaki Prefecture
Bays of Kyushu